Turner Ashby Jr. (October 23, 1828 – June 6, 1862) was an American officer. He was a Confederate cavalry commander in the American Civil War. 

In his youth, he organized an informal cavalry company known as the Mountain Rangers, which became part of the 7th Virginia Cavalry ("Ashby's Cavalry"). On the outbreak of the Civil War, Ashby and his troopers were assigned to the Virginia Militia command of Colonel Thomas J. "Stonewall" Jackson. Although Jackson's Valley campaign owed much to Ashby's reconnaissance and screening, Ashby was criticized by Jackson for the lax training and discipline of his men. By the time Ashby was killed, leading his men at the Battle of Good's Farm near Harrisonburg, he had received his general’s star. However, Ashby's official rank is contested as the promotion was not confirmed until after his death.

Early years
Turner Ashby Jr. was born at Rose Bank Plantation near Markham in Fauquier County, Virginia, to Turner Ashby Sr. and Dorothea Green Ashby. As a child he often played in the waters of nearby Goose Creek, and had a pet wolf named "Lupus" that neighbors demanded he get rid of. His father died when he was young, so his mother hired Mr. Underwood as a tutor for Turner and his brother, then sent him to Major Ambler's school nearby, but Ashby preferred wandering the countryside rather than classes. In later years, he bought a residence near his childhood home and named it Wolfe's Crag. An accomplished horseman at an early age, Ashby often participated in tournaments, and won many, including once dressed as an Indian chief and riding with neither bridle nor saddle.  

With Mr. Sommerville as partner, Ashby ran a mill on his father's property until his mother sold it to neighbor Edward Carrington Marshall of the Manassas Gap Railroad. Ashby enjoyed modest success at both business and farming.

Virginia militiaman
Knowing that his father had fought as a colonel in the War of 1812, and his grandfather Jack Ashby served as a captain during the American Revolutionary War, Ashby while in his 20s organized a cavalry company of his friends that became known as the "Mountain Rangers," initially to keep order among laborers on the Manassas Gap Railroad, some of whom tended to get into drunken brawls. Among the Rangers were E.C. Marshall's nephews Thomas Marshall, James Jones Marshall and Lewis Fielding Marshall (all grandsons of Chief Justice John Marshall, who mostly resided in Richmond, Virginia or Washington, D.C., but spent the summers at his Oak Hill plantation in Fauquier County run by his son and later this grandson Thomas Marshall, also a member of the Rangers and who would die in battle in late 1864). Upon learning of John Brown's raid at Harpers Ferry, the Mountain Rangers met at Harper's Ferry, where some performed guard duty at Charles Town during Brown's trial and execution and the unit was formally absorbed into the Virginia Militia. Ashby later told his friend Major Lewis A. Armistead that the Civil War really began with John Brown's insurrection, and that those behind Brown would keep on until they forced the South to secede.

Ashby avidly followed politics and ran for the state legislature, but as a Whig (the minority party in Fauquier County) and follower of Henry Clay, he failed to win election. After the start of the Civil War, though he'd disapproved of secession, when it became obvious that Virginia would secede, Ashby told his Mountain Rangers to again meet at Harper's Ferry. This time they became Company A of the 7th Virginia Cavalry, also known as "Ashby's Brigade" or the "Laurel Brigade" after a common plant in Virginia's Mountains.  Ashby soon persuaded Governor John Letcher to order the militia to capture the federal arsenal at Harpers Ferry. When secession was approved, Ashby made his move, but U.S. forces burned most of the arsenal buildings and 15,000 small arms before he could arrive.

Civil War
At Harpers Ferry, Ashby was assigned to the Virginia Militia command of Colonel Thomas J. "Stonewall" Jackson, whom he had met at Harpers Ferry and Charles Town in 1859.  Ashby was initially assigned to guard fords across the Potomac River and bridges from Harpers Ferry to Point of Rocks, Maryland. He became known for visiting his pickets on long horseback rides (50-miles while guarding the Potomac, later 70 miles when guarding Stonewall Jackson's rear during the Valley Campaign), as well as for interfering with scouting operations of various Union forces.  Ashby's men assisted Maryland men with Confederate sympathies to pass into Virginia, and they disrupted railroad traffic on the Baltimore and Ohio Railroad as well as interfered with the Chesapeake and Ohio Canal (including blowing up Dam No. 5 upon Jackson's orders when others had failed). Ashby's brother Richard was killed skirmishing with a Union patrol along the Potomac in June 1861. Hearing rumors that his brother had been bayoneted while trying to surrender, Ashby examined the corpse, came to hate Northerners and became obsessed with revenge.

On July 23, 1861, Brigadier General Joseph E. Johnston appointed Ashby lieutenant colonel of the 7th Virginia Cavalry. Due to the illness of the regimental commander, Col. Angus McDonald, Ashby had effective control of half of the regiment, which he operated separately. When the commander retired in February 1862, Ashby assumed command of the entire regiment on March 12. Ashby organized the first Confederate horse artillery, named Chew's Battery, as part of this regiment. The 7th did not participate directly in the First Battle of Manassas, arriving on July 22, but Ashby aided the Confederate cause by screening the movement of Johnston's army to the Manassas area. The Union had hoped that Johnston's forces would be pinned down by Major General Robert Patterson, but Ashby's screen allowed Johnston to move freely without Patterson's interference. In October 1861, Ashby led an attack on Harpers Ferry, the armory having returned to Union control, but lost to Union forces led by Colonel John W. Geary in what became known as the "Battle of Bolivar Heights".

By the spring of 1862, the 7th Virginia Cavalry had reached the enormous size of 27 infantry and cavalry companies, much larger than a typical Civil War regiment, plus Ashby lacked staff officers and had lax discipline despite his tireless patrols of the long picket lines. Stonewall Jackson, in overall command of the Shenandoah Valley, tried to strip Ashby of his cavalry forces, ordering them to be assigned to two infantry brigades. When Ashby threatened to resign in protest, Jackson backed down. Jackson continued to resist Ashby's promotion to brigadier general, due to his informal military training and lax discipline. Nevertheless, Ashby's promotion came through on May 23, 1862, and he received his promotion and general's star in a ceremony at the Taylor Hotel in Winchester, Virginia.

Ashby's vigorous reconnaissance and screening were factors in the success of Jackson's Valley campaign in the Shenandoah Valley in 1862. However, Ashby failed Jackson in some instances. At the First Battle of Kernstown, Jackson attacked a retreating Union column that Ashby had estimated to be four regiments of infantry, about the size of Jackson's force. It turned out to be an entire division of 9,000 men, and Jackson was forced to retreat. At the First Battle of Winchester, as Union forces under Maj. Gen. Nathaniel P. Banks were retreating, Ashby failed to cut off their retreat because his troopers were plundering captured wagons.

As Jackson's army withdrew from the pressure of Maj. Gen. John C. Frémont's superior forces, moving from Harrisonburg toward Port Republic, Ashby commanded the rear guard. On June 6, 1862, near Harrisonburg, the 1st New Jersey Cavalry attacked Ashby's position at Good's Farm. Although Ashby defeated the cavalry attack, the following infantry engagement resulted in his horse being shot, so Ashby charged ahead on foot. After only a few steps, he was shot through the heart, killing him instantly. (The origin of the fatal shot remains unclear. Soldiers of the 13th Pennsylvania Reserve Infantry, the "Bucktails", claimed credit, but some accounts blame it on friendly fire.) His last words were "Charge, men! For God's sake. Charge!" waving his sword, when a bullet pierced him in the breast and he fell dead."

He had been appointed brigadier general just two weeks before his death. Although he is sometimes referred to as a general and his name often appears in lists of Confederate generals, his appointment as brigadier general was never confirmed by the Confederate Senate. He died two weeks after his appointment and the Confederate Senate did not act to confirm the appointment during that time.

Legacy

Stonewall Jackson's report of the engagement sums up the man (although considering Jackson's resistance to Ashby's promotion, the eulogy might be an exaggeration in favor of the young man):

Ashby was buried at the University of Virginia Cemetery, but in October 1866, his body was reinterred at the Stonewall Cemetery in Winchester, Virginia, next to the body of his younger brother Richard Ashby, who was killed in Hampshire County in a skirmish with Union soldiers in 1861.  The Turner Ashby Monument can be found in Harrisonburg, Virginia, at the spot where Ashby was fatally shot in the Battle of Harrisonburg at Chestnut Ridge.

Turner Ashby High School, in Bridgewater, Virginia, is named after the general. A biography of Ashby was written by his relative Thomas Ashby.

See also
 List of American Civil War generals (Acting Confederate)

Notes

References
 Dupuy, Trevor N., Curt Johnson, and David L. Bongard. Harper Encyclopedia of Military Biography. New York: HarperCollins, 1992. .
 Eicher, John H., and David J. Eicher. Civil War High Commands. Stanford, CA: Stanford University Press, 2001. .
 Historical Marker Database (HMdb.org)
 Henderson, G. F. R. Stonewall Jackson and the American Civil War. New York: Smithmark, 1995. . First published in 1903 by Longman, Greens, and Co.
 [Wright, Marcus J.] United States War Department, The Military Secretary's Office, Memorandum relative to the general officers appointed by the President in the armies of the Confederate States--1861-1865 (1908) (Compiled from official records) Caption shows 1905 but printing date is February 11, 1908. Retrieved August 5, 2010.

External links
Turner Ashby Camp
Turner Ashby in Encyclopedia Virginia
Online biography
Excerpt from The Valley Campaigns: Being the Reminiscences of a Non-Combatant While Between the Lines in the Shenandoah Valley During the War of the States By Thomas A. Ashby
Turner Ashby Letters at James Madison University

1828 births
1862 deaths
Confederate States Army officers
People from Winchester, Virginia
People of Virginia in the American Civil War
Confederate States of America military personnel killed in the American Civil War
United States Army Rangers
People from Fauquier County, Virginia
Fauquier County in the American Civil War
Burials at the University of Virginia Cemetery